KGB Museum may refer to one of the following

Museum of the KGB, Moscow, Russia
Vilnius KGB Museum, Lithuania
 A museum on the 23rd floor of the Sokos Hotel Viru, Tallinn

See also
 KGB Espionage Museum, New York City